Udohöhe is a mountain of Saxony, southeastern Germany.

References

Mountains of Saxony
Mountains of the Ore Mountains